Eric Laporte may refer to:
 Éric Laporte, Quebec politician
 Eric Laporte (tenor)